The California National Primate Research Center (CNPRC) is a federally funded biomedical research facility, dedicated to improving human and animal health, and located on the University of California, Davis, campus.  The CNPRC is part of a network of seven National Primate Research Centers developed to breed, house, care for and study primates for medical and behavioral research.  Opened in 1962, researchers at this secure facility have investigated many diseases, ranging from asthma and Alzheimer's disease to AIDS and other infectious diseases, and has also produced discoveries about autism.  CNPRC currently houses about 4,700 monkeys, the majority of which are rhesus macaques, with a small population of South American titi monkeys.  The center, located on 300 acres (1.2 km2) 2.5 miles west of the UC Davis campus, is sponsored by the National Institutes of Health (NIH).

Research program
Scientists using the center's facilities produce numerous papers annually detailing their investigations into human health issues. The center's research units are focused on four primary topics:  Brain, mind, and behavior; infectious diseases; reproductive sciences and regenerative medicine; and respiratory diseases.

Outreach
Through their Affiliate and Pilot Research program, CNPRC supports visiting scientists by providing access to facilities and equipment.  Similarly, the Center aids off-site researchers with veterinary services from in-house professionals.

As with most federally funded research institutions, CNPRC provides educational outreach programs to the local community.  They invite local elementary school students to learn about the research and animals through a standardized two-hour program.  Children and their teachers learn some basics of primate biology, and about some of the primate-based biomedical research that is performed at the center.  Furthermore, the Center provides resources to elementary science teachers to promote biology, particularly primate biology and behavior, instruction.

See also
 David Amaral
 Yerkes National Primate Research Center

References

External links
CNPRC home page

Organizations established in 1962
Medical research institutes in California
Primate research centers
University of California, Davis
Medical and health organizations based in California